Confessions of a Serial Killer is a 1985 American horror film directed by Mark Blair.  Preceding Henry: Portrait of a Serial Killer by one year, the film details a serial killer (based on Henry Lee Lucas) who, after being arrested, confesses to the murders of over 200 women.

Synopsis
Daniel Ray (Robert A. Burns) has been arrested and much to the surprise and horror of the police officers, he begins to confess to the murders of over 200 women. He also talks about his background as a childhood abuse victim and runaway before meeting Moon (Dennis Hill) and Molly (Sidney Brammer), who accompanied him on several of his murders. This proves to be too much for Sheriff Will Gaines (Berkley Garrett) to believe, only for Daniel Ray to describe the events that led to his capture and arrest.

Cast
Robert A. Burns as Daniel Ray Hawkins
Dennis Hill as Moon Lewton
Berkley Garrett as Sheriff Will Gaines
Sidney Brammer as Molly Lewton
DeeDee Norton as Monica Krivics (as Dee Dee Norton)
Ollie Handley as Doctor Earl Krivics
Demp Toney as Doris Simpson
Lainie Frasier as Stranded Motorist (as Lainie Ferrante)
Eleese Lester as Karen Grimes
Colom L. Keating as Detective Barnes (as Colom Keating)
Dayna Blackwell as Girl Hitchhiker
John Browning as Doctor Spivey
Carla Edson as Honkytonk Girl
Gene Grottke as Deputy Sheriff
Brady Coleman as Arresting Officer #1

Reception
AllMovie compared Confessions of a Serial Killer to the 1986 film Henry: Portrait of a Serial Killer, saying that "where Henry's flat, non-judgmental documentary style served to amplify the horror of the proceedings, this film's depiction of the killings draws too heavily on slasher-movie conventions, which rob the story of its potency". TV Guide gave the film a rating of 2 1/2 stars out of 4.

References

External links

1985 films
1985 horror films
1985 thriller films
1980s crime thriller films
American horror thriller films
American crime thriller films
American serial killer films
Crime films based on actual events
American independent films
1980s English-language films
1980s American films